[[Image:Lord Robert Manners (1758-1782)00.jpg|thumb|285px|The Death of Lord Robert Manners" (1786) on HMS Resolution]]
HMS Resolution was a 74-gun third rate ship of the line of the Royal Navy, designed by Sir Thomas Slade and built by Adam Hayes at Deptford Dockyard and launched on 12 April 1770. The ship had a huge crew of 600 men. As one of the Royal Navy's largest ships she took part in seven major naval battles.

Service History
She took part in the Spithead review of 1773.

She participated in the Battle of Cape St. Vincent (1780), Battle off Halifax (1780), the Battle of the Chesapeake (1781), Battle of Fort Royal (1781) and the Battle of the Saintes (1782), under the command of Lord Robert Manners, who was mortally wounded in the battle and died during his return to England.

She was reported at Halifax, Nova Scotia on 17 May 1776 with Vice-Admiral Murray

In later life she was part of the Battle of Copenhagen (1807) and Battle of the Basque Roads (1809).

In 1809 she was part of the Expedition to the Scheldt.Resolution was broken up in 1813.

Notable Commanders

Captain William Hotham 1770 to 1773
Captain Chaloner Ogle 1775 to 1780
Lord Robert Manners 1780 to 1782
Sir James Wallace briefly in 1782
Captain William Lechmere 1797/8
Captain Alan Hyde Gardner 1799 to 1802
Captain George Burlton 1806 to 1809

Citations and notes

References

 Lavery, Brian (2003) The Ship of the Line – Volume 1: The development of the battlefleet 1650–1850.'' Conway Maritime Press. .

External links
 

Ships of the line of the Royal Navy
Elizabeth-class ships of the line
1770 ships
Ships built in Deptford